Tom Skinner is an English drummer, percussionist, and record producer. He co-founded the jazz band Sons of Kemet and is a member of the rock band the Smile. He has released two albums under the name Hello Skinny. His first album under his own name, Voices of Bishara, was released in November 2022.

Career 
Skinner began playing drums at the age of nine. He enjoyed 1990s grunge and metal bands such as Napalm Death, before discovering experimental jazz musicians such as John Zorn and Ornette Coleman.

Skinner emerged in the London jazz scene, playing with musicians including Finn Peters, Cleveland Watkiss and Denys Baptiste, and the electronic artist Matthew Herbert. Skinner was a member of the jazz trio Zed-U and the avant-garde soul group Elmore Judd. In 2011, he cofounded the jazz band Sons of Kemet. They released four albums and announced their disbandment in 2022.

Skinner first worked with the Radiohead guitarist Jonny Greenwood when he performed on Greenwood's soundtrack for the 2012 film The Master. In 2021, Skinner debuted a new band, the Smile, with Greenwood and the Radiohead singer Thom Yorke. They made their surprise debut in a performance streamed by Glastonbury Festival that May. In May 2022, they released their debut album, A Light for Attracting Attention, and began an international tour.

Skinner has released two albums under the name Hello Skinny. The first album released under his own name, Voices of Bishara, was released on 4 November 2022. It features jazz musicians including Shabaka Hutchings, Nubya Garcia, Kareem Dayes and Tom Herbert. The first single, "Bishara", was released in September 2022. NPR described Skinner as "the sort of drummer who always locates the pivot point between chaos and clarity".

In December 2020, Skinner joined several British jazz musicians to record a Miles Davis tribute album, London Brew, set for release on 31 March 2023 by Concord Jazz.

Personal life 
Skinner has two children and lives in North London.

Discography

As Hello Skinny 
 Hello Skinny (2012)
 Revolutions EP (2013)
 Watermelon Sun (2017)

As Tom Skinner 
 Voices of Bishara (2022)

With Sons of Kemet 
 Burn (2013)
 Lest We Forget What We Came Here to Do (2015)
 Your Queen Is a Reptile (2018)
 Black to the Future (2021)

With the Smile 
 A Light for Attracting Attention (2022)

With London Brew 

 London Brew (2023)

References 

Year of birth missing (living people)
Living people
English jazz drummers
English rock drummers
The Smile (band) members
Sons of Kemet members
Musicians from London